Xianshui River — a river in Sichuan province, southern China.

Geography
The Xianshui River has three river sources, the Da-chu river (Chinese characters:达曲) and Nyi-chu river (Chinese characters:泥曲). After the confluence of the two rivers in Luhuo, the name becomes the Xianshui River.

A dam and hydroelectric plant on it in Luhuo was completed in 2009.

Yangtze River
The Xianshui River flows into the Yalong River at Yajiang.  Via the Yalong River confluence, the Xianshui is a tributary of the Yangtze River (Chang Jiang).

See also
Xianshuihe fault system
Index: Tributaries of the Yangtze River

References 

Rivers of Sichuan
Tributaries of the Yangtze River